Alisha is a 2001 punk rock alternative album by Alisha Chinai. The album was an attempt by the singer to reinvent herself, and was a moderate commercial success. It was composed by Sandeep Chowta.

Track listing
Seulement-Vous (Only you)	
Ishq Se Ishq	
Dilbar Jaaniya	
Maashuka	
Woh Pyaar Meraa	
Soniyaa	
Don't Want Your Love	
Aayi Teri Yaad	
Dhuaan Dhuaan	
Can You Dance

References

2001 albums
Alisha Chinai albums
Hindi-language albums